This is a list of Northern Irish football transfers for the 2017 Summer Transfer Window.

Danske Bank Premiership

Ards

In:

Out:

Ballinamallard United

In:

Out:

Ballymena United

In:

Out:

Carrick Rangers

In:

Out:

Cliftonville

In:

Out:

Coleraine

In:

Out:

Crusaders

In:

Out:

Dungannon Swifts

In:

Out:

Glenavon

In:

Out:

Glentoran

In:

Out:

Linfield

In:

Out:

Warrenpoint

In:

Out:

NIFL Championship

NIFL PIL

References

Northern Irish
Lists of Northern Irish football transfers